For association football in Spain, the 1995–96 Tercera División season is the 19th season since the establishment of the tier four.

League table

Group 1

Group 2

Group 3

Group 4

Group 5

Group 6

Group 7

Group 8

Group 9

Group 10

Group 11

Group 12

Group 13

Group 14

Group 15

Group 16

Group 17

Playoffs
 1995–96 Segunda División B Play-Off

References

External links
www.rsssf.com

Tercera División seasons
4
Spain